Qarchak Prison is a prison for women located in Qarchak, in Qarchak County, previously part of Varamin County, Tehran Province, Iran (30 km SSE of the capital). It is also called  (Shahr-e Rey prison), “Gharchak Women’s Prison“, Rey Penitentiary or Varamin prison.

Health and sanitation conditions
Health conditions are very poor inside Qarchak. There is no proper sewer.
 According to the NCRI Women's Committee, the prison infirmary was ill-equipped to deal with outbreaks of coronavirus and did not have masks or sanitary supplies for inmates.

Prisoners
The prison's seven sections contain more than 1400 prisoners, which is twice the nominal capacity.

As of July 2020, 17 female political prisoners are being detained in Qarchak prison.

On 23 May 2020, Soheila Hejab, a 30-year-old law graduate sentenced to 18 years in prison for forming a group for women's rights and who had been summoned for that day to the Court of Appeals, was brutally arrested on leaving the hearing by IRGC agents, and taken to Qarchak.

In June 2020, it was reported that political prisoners in Qarchak had been infected with COVID-19.

On 26 July 2020, the Australian academic Kylie Moore-Gilbert was moved from Evin to Qarchak. Moore-Gilbert was later returned to Evin and freed in November 2020.

On 20 October 2020, human rights activist and lawyer Nasrin Sotoudeh was moved to Qarchak from Evin prison.

Reactions
Qarchak prison is listed under Section 106 of the US's Countering America's Adversaries Through Sanctions Act (CAATSA) on the basis of extrajudicial killings, torture and other violations of human rights.

On 7 December 2021, the U.S. Department of the Treasury added Soghra Khodadadi (described as "the current director of Qarchak") to its Specially Designated Nationals (SDN) list. Individuals on the list have their assets blocked and U.S. persons are generally prohibited from dealing with them. The listing said Khodadadi "was responsible for ordering and directly participating in a violent attack on December 13, 2020 against prisoners of conscience in Ward 8 along with at least 20 other guards. According to publicly available reports, prison guards beat these female prisoners of conscience with batons and stun guns. Khodadadi ordered this attack in retaliation for the prisoners exercising their right to freedom of expression."

See also

 Human rights in Iran
 Judicial system of Iran #Prison system

References

Buildings and structures in Tehran
Human rights abuses in Iran
Prisons in Iran
Specially Designated Nationals and Blocked Persons List
Iranian entities subject to the U.S. Department of the Treasury sanctions